Valentin Spasov (born 16 April 1946) is a Bulgarian former basketball player. He competed in the men's tournament at the 1968 Summer Olympics.

References

1946 births
Living people
Bulgarian men's basketball players
Olympic basketball players of Bulgaria
Basketball players at the 1968 Summer Olympics
Basketball players from Sofia